Faber Firsts is a series of ten 'first' (debut) novels published in 2009 to celebrate the 80th Anniversary of the publishing company Faber and Faber, founded in 1929. The series is also available as a boxed set.

Included in the series (with first published date):

Lord of the Flies by William Golding (1954)
Cover Her Face by P. D. James (1962)
The Barracks by John McGahern (1963)
The Bell Jar by Sylvia Plath (1963)
Bliss by Peter Carey (1981)
A Pale View of Hills by Kazuo Ishiguro (1982)
The New York Trilogy by Paul Auster (1987)
The White Castle by Orhan Pamuk (1990 in English)
The Buddha of Suburbia by Hanif Kureishi (1990)
Such a Long Journey by Rohinton Mistry (1991)

Sources
Faber 80

External links
Series: Faber Firsts

Lists of novels
Faber and Faber books